Arthur Charles Hardy,  (December 3, 1872 – March 13, 1962) was a Canadian lawyer and politician.

Life and career
Born in Brantford, Ontario, Hardy ran for the House of Commons of Canada in the Ontario riding of Leeds in the 1917 federal election. Although unsuccessful in that election, he was considered a powerful and influential figure within the Liberal Party.

In 1922, Hardy was called to the Senate of Canada representing the senatorial division of Leeds, Ontario. A Liberal, he served in the Senate for forty years until his death in 1962. In 1930, he was the Speaker of the Senate of Canada.

Hardy was a graduate of Osgoode Hall Law School, and he worked primarily as a lawyer. He was also an owner of radio station CHML in Hamilton, until the station was sold to Ken Soble in 1942. In 1938, he was appointed as a corporate director of Dominion Life.

Family
Hardy was the son of Arthur Sturgis Hardy, who served as the fourth Premier of Ontario from 1896 to 1899. He married Dorothy Fulford, the daughter of Senator George Taylor Fulford.

References

External links

 Speakers of the Senate biography

1872 births
1962 deaths
Candidates in the 1917 Canadian federal election
Members of the King's Privy Council for Canada
Canadian senators from Ontario
Politicians from Brantford
Speakers of the Senate of Canada
Canadian mass media owners
Lawyers in Ontario
Liberal Party of Canada candidates for the Canadian House of Commons